Furioso was an influential sire of jumping horses, and is found in the pedigrees of many top show jumpers today.

Life

After World War II, he was purchased by the French National Stud, where he was used as a breeding stallion until his death in 1968.

Descendants
Furioso was in the lines of 17 of the top 100 show jumping sires of the 1990s.

Furioso II: sired 10 horses that competed at the Tokyo Olympics
Cor de la Bryère

See also
Precipitation (horse)
Haras national du Pin

Notes

References

External links
HorseMagazine.com

1939 racehorse births
1968 racehorse deaths
Show jumping horses
Thoroughbred family 1-o
Racehorses trained in the United Kingdom
Racehorses bred in the United Kingdom
Sport horse sires
Individual male horses